Koverlevo is a rural locality (a village) in Tolpukhovskoye Rural Settlement, Sobinsky District, Vladimir Oblast, Russia. The population was 11 as of 2010.

Geography 
Koverlevo is located 31 km north of Sobinka (the district's administrative centre) by road. Danilovka is the nearest rural locality.

References 

Rural localities in Sobinsky District